The Florida SpringFest is a three-day annual showcase in popular music acts, both local and national, in downtown Pensacola, Florida. The Florida SpringFest is traditionally held anywhere from mid-May until early June.

The event has been running nearly every year since 1990 (except 2020), when Pensacola businessman Bill Dollarhide funded much of the expense out of his own pocket so up-and-coming local acts could reach a wider audience. In turn, part of the revenues were given to the Alzheimer's Foundation, to which Dollarhide donated regularly.

In the years since, Dollarhide turned the management over to a Board of Directors and full-time staff. Under the direction of Michelle Sarra and Geoff Fairchild, the event grew to sell-out crowds as they decided to incorporate bigger names to bring more crowds. Popular national and international acts, such as ( Rock and Roll Legends American Suicide ) Little Richard, Jerry Lee Lewis, Chuck Berry, Los Lobos, Widespread Panic, Gov't Mule, North Mississippi Allstars, Galactic, George Clinton & Parliament Funk, Drive-By Truckers, The Black Crowes, Chingy, Brother Cane, Foreigner, Kansas, Better Than Ezra, Jethro Tull, BBMak, Willie Nelson, O-Town, The B-52's, John Michael Montgomery, Creed, Collective Soul, Three Doors Down, The Doobie Brothers, Bruce Hornsby, Lonestar, Smashmouth, Patti LaBelle, Little Feat, Hank Williams, Jr., Train, Hootie & the Blowfish, Live, Blues Traveler, Papa Roach, Sugar Ray, Lit, Morris Day and the Time, Run D.M.C., Eddie Money, Neville Brothers, The Allman Brothers Band and Everclear have played for fans at SpringFest.

The novelty of SpringFest is its setting right in the heart of downtown. For all three days, multiple blocks are cordoned off to cars, and large stages are set up on street corners. Multiple acts play at any given time throughout the day, with the best-known acts saved for evening performances. The anticipation for SpringFest is large in the community, with the Pensacola News Journal dedicating an entire issue of their Weekender lifestyles magazine to the event. 

Although the event has more or less stayed true to its roots, the sponsors of Florida SpringFest have incorporated new ideas and locales, which were not successful. In 2004, Michelle Sarra and Geoff Fairchild left to pursue other entertainment opportunities, management of SpringFest was turned over to a management company and the event was held inside the Pensacola Civic Center as opposed to the normal outside setting. The number of bands playing at the same time in an enclosed area proved to be hard for listeners to decipher, and the experiment was regarded as a failure. In 2005, SpringFest returned to the streets of downtown. However, the sponsors could not recoup their losses from 2004 and make new profits for that year, and canceled the scheduled SpringFest for 2006. The 2007 SpringFest was also cancelled for many of the same reasons, including sponsorship issues.  

SpringFest announced they would not be coming back in 2008, but would try for 2009. Unfortunately it they have yet to return to the streets of Pensacola. Instead in 2010 DeLuna Fest came to the beaches of Pensacola and has run 2 very successful years and is planning on returning in 2012.

No SpringFest was held in 2020.

External links

References

Rock festivals in the United States
Festivals in Florida
Tourist attractions in Pensacola, Florida
Blues festivals in the United States
Country music festivals in the United States
1990 establishments in Florida
Recurring events established in 1990